The Stits SA-7 Skycoupe is a two-seat, side-by-side seating, high wing homebuilt aircraft designed by Ray Stits.

Design
Ray Stits designed 14 different homebuilt aircraft kits that were some of the first available to the general public built in quantity. Stits is also known to the general public as the maker of the Stits Junior, Stits SA-2A Sky Baby, and Stits Baby Bird, each of which was once the world's smallest aircraft. Engineer Harold Dale assisted in the certification process after completing his Dale Weejet 800.

The Skycoupe was provided as a kit with a pre-fabricated steel tube fuselage. The surfaces are fabric covered.

Variants
SA-7A
SA-7B
Powered by a Continental C85
SA-7C
SA-7D 
Updated with a squared off swept tail configuration.
SA-9A
 A type certificated version.

Specifications Stits SA-7B Sky-Coupe

See also

References

Homebuilt aircraft